Heinrich Franz Vosseler (1885–1975) was a New Zealand engineer and oil refinery owner. He was born in Wellington, New Zealand in 1885.

References

1885 births
1975 deaths
People from Wellington City
20th-century New Zealand engineers